Otradny is a rural locality (a settlement) in Takhtamukayskoye Rural Settlement of Takhtamukaysky District, the Republic of Adygea, Russia. The population was 671 as of 2018. There are 6 streets.

Geography 
Otradny is located 9 km southwest of Takhtamukay (the district's administrative centre) by road. Natukhay is the nearest rural locality.

References 

Rural localities in Takhtamukaysky District